Typhlachirus caecus is a species of sole native to the coastal waters of Indonesia.  This species grows to a length of  TL.  This species is the only known member of its genus.

References
 

Soleidae
Fish described in 1931
Fish of Indonesia